Ian Ferguson is a Canadian author and playwright.

He is the brother of journalist and author Will Ferguson, with whom he co-wrote the 2001 book How to Be a Canadian (Even If You Already Are One).

Ferguson won the Stephen Leacock Award in 2004 for Village of the Small Houses, a biography and humorous look at growing up in Fort Vermilion, Alberta.

References

20th-century Canadian dramatists and playwrights
People from Mackenzie County
Canadian people of Scottish descent
Year of birth missing (living people)
Living people
Stephen Leacock Award winners
Canadian male dramatists and playwrights
20th-century Canadian male writers